Tanisha Monét Carey (born June 9, 1977), better known by her stage name Jerzee Monét, is an American singer-songwriter formerly signed to DreamWorks Records.

Early life
Jerzee's parents are divorced. Her mom is a Jehovah Witness and her cousins are Muslims. She previously worked as a hairstylist and a chef before releasing her debut album.

Music career
While working as a chef Ruff Ryders came to eat where she worked. She and East Coast rapper DMX exchanged phone numbers and he encouraged her to pursue her dreams. She later signed a record deal with DreamWorks Records and started creating her debut project entitled Love & War. In 2002, Jerzee released her debut single entitled "Most High" featuring DMX. She released her second single "Work It Out," which did not chart. She released her debut album "Love & War" which peaked at 60 on Billboard 200 and at 14 on Top R&B/Hip-Hop Albums charts.

Discography

Studio albums

References

1977 births
Living people
Musicians from Trenton, New Jersey
Singer-songwriters from New Jersey
African-American women singer-songwriters
American rhythm and blues singer-songwriters
DreamWorks Records artists
21st-century African-American women singers